P. Boice Esser (February 23, 1916 – July 23, 1974) was an American politician who served on the Greenburgh Town Council and in the New York State Assembly from Westchester's 2nd district from 1959 to 1964.

He died on July 23, 1974, in Hartsdale, New York at age 58.

References

1916 births
1974 deaths
Republican Party members of the New York State Assembly
20th-century American politicians